Gymnopilus parvulus is a species of mushroom in the family Hymenogastraceae.

Description

Habitat and distribution
Gymnopilus parvulus grows on logs. It has been found in Jamaica between October and January.

See also
List of Gymnopilus species

References

External links
Gymnopilus parvulus at Index Fungorum

parvulus
Fungi of North America
Taxa named by William Alphonso Murrill